A social cataloging application is a web application designed to help users to catalog things such as books, films, music albums, etc. owned or otherwise of interest to them. The phrase refers to two characteristics that generally arise from a multi-user cataloging environment:
The ability to share catalogs and interact with others based upon shared items;
The enrichment or improvement of cataloging description through either explicit cooperation in the production of cataloging metadata or through the analysis of implicit data (e.g. "people who like X also like Y").

References

See also
 Comparison of reference management software
 List of social bookmarking websites
 Recommender system
Library 2.0
 
Web 2.0